Hubert Burley Atkinson (June 4, 1904 – February 2, 1961) was an American Major League Baseball player. He played for the Washington Senators during the  season.

References

Washington Senators (1901–1960) players
1904 births
1961 deaths
Baseball players from Chicago